Sticky boobialla is a common name for several plants and may refer to:

Myoporum petiolatum
Myoporum viscosum, endemic to South Australia